Ralph Giordano (born Raffaele Giordano, May 27, 1905 – July 15, 1993), better known as Young Corbett III, was an Italian-born American boxer. He was the World Welterweight Champion in 1933 and the NYSAC Middleweight champion in 1938. A tough southpaw, he did not have strong punching power but was known for his great speed and determination. Corbett is considered one of the greatest southpaws of all time and one of the all-time great counterpunchers. He was inducted into the Fresno County Athletic Hall of Fame in 1959, the Italian American Sports Hall of Fame in 1982, and the International Boxing Hall of Fame in 2004.

Biography

Early life 
Born in Rionero in Vulture, in the Italian region of Basilicata, from Vito Giordano and Gelsomina Capobianco, he moved with his family to the United States when he was still an infant and was erroneously registered as Raffaele Capabianca Giordano. After four years of living in Pittsburgh, Pennsylvania, he moved to Fresno, California, and began boxing in 1919 while still a 14-year-old "newsboy." One day Corbett and a friend hopped a freight train headed for Sacramento searching for a match there but they arrived in Marysville by mistake, where they attended a boxing show that night. After convincing the promoter that he was a fighter, Corbett faced a more experienced boxer named Eddie Morris, who knocked him out in the third round. Corbett, however, earned $7.50 for his performance. 

After graduating from Edison High School in 1920, Corbett began to practice more seriously. He got his stage name when a ring announcer told him he would not present him as Ralph Giordano and dubbed him "Young Corbett III" because his fighting style reminded him of William J. Rothwell, known as Young Corbett II, or, according to other sources, for his haircut similar to that of heavyweight champion James J. Corbett.

Boxing career

Corbett fought many great fighters of his era, suffering only 5 defeats in his first 75 recorded bouts. He engaged in a four-fight series with future welterweight champion Young Jack Thompson, winning three and drawing once. He also scored wins over Jack Zivic, Sgt. Sammy Baker, welterweight champion Jackie Fields and future middleweight king Ceferino Garcia.

Before a crowd of 16,000 on February 22, 1933, Corbett captured the welterweight championship of the world by decisioning Jackie Fields over 10 rounds at San Francisco's Seals Stadium. He competed with a broken hand received from a sparring session three days before the fight, and hurt his left thumb in the fifth round but continued to fight undaunted. Referee Jack Kennedy remembered Corbett as "vicious in those first five rounds. He ripped him like a tiger. Fields could not protect himself". 

Three months later, he was dethroned by Hall of Famer Jimmy McLarnin in a first round knockout. Corbett then moved up to the middleweight division. He scored wins over future light heavy champ Gus Lesnevich (TKO 5), as well as Hall of Famers Mickey Walker, and Billy Conn. On February 22, 1938 he beat Fred Apostoli, winning the middleweight championship. On November 18 of that year, he challenged Apostoli again, but was stopped in 8 rounds.

Retirement and death 
Corbett boxed until August 20, 1940, winning his last fight against Richard "Sheik" Rangel. He retired with a 123-11-17 (33 KOs) record. He later operated a bar in Fresno. On October 2, 1945 Corbett survived a serious car accident on Highway 99 near Delano, suffering a fractured skull and other injuries. He died in Auberry, California at the age of 88, after about 20 years afflicted with Alzheimer's disease. A statue of him, posed in a fighting stance and boxing gloves, was erected in Fresno. The sculpture was realized by Clement Renzi.

Personal life 
Beside the boxing career, Corbett was a physical education instructor for the California Highway Patrol and a grape grower. His cousin Al Manfredo (1912-1990) also was a boxer and later a boxing manager. Corbett is the great-grandfather of former American football safety Matt Giordano.

Professional boxing record

See also
List of welterweight boxing champions
List of middleweight boxing champions

References

Bibliography 
James B. Roberts, Alexander G. Skutt, The Boxing Register: International Boxing Hall of Fame Official Record Book, McBooks Press, 2006
David L. Hudson Jr., Combat Sports: An Encyclopedia of Wrestling, Fighting, and Mixed Martial Arts, ABC-CLIO, 2009

External links

 https://boxrec.com/media/index.php/The_Ring_Magazine%27s_Annual_Ratings:_Welterweight--1930s
 https://boxrec.com/media/index.php/National_Boxing_Association%27s_Quarterly_Ratings:_1933
 https://titlehistories.com/boxing/na/usa/ny/nysac-wl.html

1905 births
1993 deaths
Middleweight boxers
American people of Italian descent
International Boxing Hall of Fame inductees
Welterweight boxers
World welterweight boxing champions
Italian male boxers
Boxers from California
People from Rionero in Vulture
Sportspeople from the Province of Potenza
Sportspeople from Fresno, California
American male boxers
Italian emigrants to the United States